The canton of Beausoleil is an administrative division of the Alpes-Maritimes department, southeastern France. Its borders were modified at the French canton reorganisation which came into effect in March 2015. Its seat is in Beausoleil.

It consists of the following communes:

Beaulieu-sur-Mer
Beausoleil
Cap-d'Ail
Èze
Saint-Jean-Cap-Ferrat
La Turbie
Villefranche-sur-Mer

References

Cantons of Alpes-Maritimes